Kelly Jonker (born 23 May 1990, Amstelveen) is a Dutch field hockey player.

At the 2012 Summer Olympics, she competed for the Netherlands women's national field hockey team in the women's event, winning a gold medal.  She also competed for the team four years later in Rio, where the Netherlands won the silver medal.

References

External links 
 

1990 births
Living people
Dutch female field hockey players
Field hockey players at the 2008 Summer Olympics
Field hockey players at the 2012 Summer Olympics
Medalists at the 2012 Summer Olympics
Olympic field hockey players of the Netherlands
Olympic gold medalists for the Netherlands
Olympic medalists in field hockey
Sportspeople from Amstelveen
Field hockey players at the 2016 Summer Olympics
Medalists at the 2016 Summer Olympics
Olympic silver medalists for the Netherlands
Female field hockey forwards
20th-century Dutch women
21st-century Dutch women